Classicide is a concept proposed by sociologist Michael Mann to describe the deliberate and systematic destruction, in whole or in part, of a social class through persecution and violence. Although it was first used by physician and anti-communist activist Fred Schwarz in 1972, classicide was popularized by Mann as a term that is similar to but distinct from genocide because it means the "intended mass killing of entire social classes." Classicide is considered a form of "premeditated mass killing", which is narrower than genocide, because the target of a classicide is a part of a population which is defined by its social status, and classicide is also considered broader than politicide because the group which is targeted for classicide is killed without any concern for its political activities.

Definition 
Classicide was first used by Schwarz in his 1972 book The Three Faces of Revolution. It was later used by Mann as a well-defined term. Since then, classicide has been used by some sociologists, such as Mann and Martin Shaw, to describe the unique forms of genocide which pertain to the annihilation of a class through murder or displacement and the destruction of the bourgeoisie to form an equal proletariat, although Mann does not use genocide in reference to examples under Communist states.

Political scientist Christophe Jaffrelot and historian Jacques Sémelin write that "Mann thus establishes a sort of parallel between racial enemies and class enemies, thereby contributing to the debates on comparisons between Nazism and communism. This theory has also been developed by some French historians such as Stéphane Courtois and Jean-Louis Margolin in The Black Book of Communism: they view class genocide as the equivalent to racial genocide. However, Mann refuses to use the term 'genocide' to describe the crimes which were committed under communism. He prefers to use the terms 'fratricide' and 'classicide', a word which he coined in reference to the intentional mass killings of entire social classes."

Examples 
According to Mann, examples of classicide include the dekulakization policy during the forced collectivization in the Soviet Union under the Stalin era of the better off peasants, who were labelled as kulaks and identified as "class enemies" by the Soviet regime, and the Cambodian genocide by the Khmer Rouge regime in Democratic Kampuchea, before being stopped by Vietnam. They were a perversion of socialist theories of democracy in the same sense as ethnic cleansing is a perversion of nationalist theory of democracy.

Human rights activist Harry Wu has identified the killings which were carried out during the Chinese Land Reform under the leadership of Mao Zedong as classicide. Wu writes that "in order to consolidate his power, Mao Zedong implemented a nation-wide ideology to undermine those who previously held power." According to Wu, this ideology included dividing people into five class categories depending on their possession of land, capital, property, and income. The five categories were the landlord class, the rich peasant class, the middle peasant class, and the poor worker and peasant classes. Those in the lower classes were "praised for their humble way of life and work ethic", while the landlords and the wealthy were demonized and persecuted. Their property was seized, they were sent to do hard manual labor in the countryside, and many of them were killed. Wu writes that "according to research, in 1949 there were around 10 to 15 million members of the landlord and rich peasant classes nationwide. By the end of the 1970s, when the Cultural Revolution had ended, only 10 to 15 percent of them remained alive."

See also 

 Class conflict
 Democide
 Eliticide
 Helots
 Land reform in North Vietnam
 Life unworthy of life
 Social cleansing

Bibliography

References 

1972 neologisms
Class discrimination
Crimes
Mass murder
Politicides
Social classes
Persecution